Morghdari-ye Sabah (also Romanized as Morghdāri-ye Sabāḥ) is a village in Kuhpayeh-e Gharbi Rural District, in the Central District of Abyek County, Qazvin Province, Iran.  During the 2006 census, its population was 19, in 5 families.  The name means Sabah Poultry.

References 

Populated places in Abyek County